Wide-field X-ray Telescope (WXT) (also known as EP-WXT-pathfinder), is a wide-field X-ray imaging space telescope launched by China in July 2022.

EP-WXT-pathfinder has a sensor module giving it a field of view of 340 square degrees. It is a preliminary mission testing the sensor design for the future Einstein Probe which will use a 12 sensor module WXT for a 3600 square degree field of view.

The sensor uses lobster-eye micropore optics.

References 

X-ray telescopes
Chinese telescopes
2022 establishments in China